Vadim Selyukin (born 26 March 1977) is a Russian sledge hockey player and a captain of the Russian sledge hockey team. In 2013 he led his team to the bronze medal at the IPC Ice Sledge Hockey World Championships which were hosted in Goyang, South Korea.

Early life
Selyukin was injured in Tajikistan while representing Russian Armed Forces there.

References

External links 
 

1977 births
Living people
Russian sledge hockey players
Paralympic sledge hockey players of Russia
Paralympic silver medalists for Russia
Medalists at the 2014 Winter Paralympics
Paralympic medalists in sledge hockey
Ice sledge hockey players at the 2014 Winter Paralympics
21st-century Russian people